Inanidrilus renaudae is a species of annelid worms. It is known from subtidal coralline sands in Îlet à Fajou, Guadeloupe, the Caribbean.

References

renaudae
Invertebrates of Guadeloupe
Fauna of the Atlantic Ocean
Endemic fauna of Guadeloupe
Animals described in 1984
Taxa named by Christer Erséus